The 2022–23 Yale Bulldogs Men's ice hockey season was the 127th season of play for the program and the 61st in the ECAC Hockey conference. The Bulldogs represented Yale University and were coached by Keith Allain, in his 16th season.

Season
After a very poor year, particularly on the offense, Yale was hoping that 2023 would be better. Unfortunately, from the very beginning, it was apparent that the Bulldogs could not score. After winning their season-opener, the team lost the next 8 games. In that stretch the Elis averaged lest than 1 goal per game and were shutout in 4 consecutive matches.

The team saw marginal improvements after the winter break and went through a stretch of 5 games without a regulation loss. While the offense did score more often, the biggest factor in those wins was substituting in Luke Pearson as the team's starting goaltender. The sophomore received the lion's share of minutes in the second half of the season and helped Yale climb out of the conference cellar. Though the offense was paltry, averaging less than 2 goals a game for the season, Yale finished 10th in the ECAC and were set against a mediocre Rensselaer squad for the first round of the postseason.

Over the course of the year, the Elis had scored more than 3 goals in just 6 of their 29 games. Coincidentally, with a strong defensive effort, they were able to win each of those games. That trend continued in the playoffs as Yale's forwards showed up against the Engineers. The Bulldogs hit the back of the net 4 times and won their first playoff game in three years. In the quarterfinals, Yale was set against the #2 team in the nation, Quinnipiac. While the Elis weren't expected to win, the team didn't even bother to show up in the first game. While Pearson and the defense did well to limit the Bobcats to 3 goals on 30 shots, Yale was only able to muster 5 shots for the entire game. The Elis performed much better in the rematch, managing to score 2 goals, but were swept out of the postseasonby their supposed rivals.

Departures

Recruiting

Roster
As of September 15, 2022.

Standings

Schedule and results

|-
!colspan=12 style="" | Regular Season

|-
!colspan=12 style=";" | 

|-
!colspan=12 ! style=""; | 

|-
!colspan=12 style=";" |

Scoring statistics

Goaltending statistics

Rankings

Note: USCHO did not release a poll in weeks 1, 13, or 26.

References

2022-23
Yale
Yale
Yale
Yale